Grace Nkenge Edwards is a Guyanese-American writer, producer, and actress. She has written for Loosely Exactly Nicole, Unbreakable Kimmy Schmidt, and Insecure. Edwards is the creator of the upcoming Daria spinoff film Jodie.

Life and career 
Edwards was born in Guyana and raised in Michigan. She received her bachelor of fine arts degree in acting from University of Michigan and her master of fine arts degree in screenwriting from Columbia University.

She was a writer's assistant for Broad City and both a writer's assistant and producer for Inside Amy Schumer. Edwards' first television writing job was for MTV’s Loosely Exactly Nicole. She went on to be a staff writer for Unbreakable Kimmy Schmidt and Dollface. She has also written for Kevin Can F**k Himself  and she was a producer for Mr. Mayor. She joined the writer's room and production team of Insecure for the show's fourth season.

Edwards is the creator and executive producer of Jodie, an upcoming Daria spin-off by MTV Studios, with voice acting by Tracee Ellis Ross. The show was initially planned as a series, but in 2022 it was announced that it will be released as a feature film.

In April 2022 it was announced that Edwards is the creator and executive producer of The Wolves of 125th Street, in development at Peacock.

She has acted on Inside Amy Schumer, Decoded, Our Cartoon President, and Insecure.

Edwards is the co-creator and co-host of the podcast The Antidote with her best friend and fellow producer Amy Aniobi. The Antidote is produced by American Public Media and focuses on positive news and strategies for joy.

Filmography

Television

Film

References

External links 
 Grace Edwards on Twitter
 

Year of birth missing (living people)
Living people
21st-century American women writers
American women screenwriters
21st-century American actresses
American television producers
University of Michigan alumni
Columbia University School of the Arts alumni
Writers from Michigan
American people of Guyanese descent
Afro-Guyanese people